In Arabic onomastics ("nisbah"), Al-Badawi denotes a relationship to or from Bedouin areas (consequently "badawi" may sometimes imply rustic). It is both a given name and a surname. Notable people with the name include:
Ahmad al-Badawi, a saint in Islam
Al-Baydawi, philosopher and mufassir
Jamal al-Bedawi, also written Jamal al-Badawi, a contemporary Yemeni accused and convicted of planning the USS Cole Bombing
Jamal Badawi, Egyptian-born Canadian professor and author
Abdel Hamid Badawi, Egyptian jurist and Foreign Minister
Abdullah Ahmad Badawi, Malaysia's fifth prime minister
Abdel Rahman Badawi, Egyptian existentialist philosopher
El-Sayyid el-Badawi, Egyptian businessman and the President of Al-Wafd Party
Helmy Bahgat Badawi, first chairman of the Suez Canal Authority
Mohamed Badawi, Sudanese linguist and publisher, singer and composer
Mohsen Badawi, Egyptian entrepreneur, political activist, and writer
Nadia Badawi, Egyptian-born Australian medical researcher, specialising in cerebral palsy
Raif Badawi, Saudi Arabian blogger and prisoner of conscience
Samar Badawi, Saudi Arabian human rights activist
Zaki Badawi, Muslim scholar
Zeinab Badawi, British newsreader and broadcaster
 Habib Badawi Lebanese scholar and professor of Japanese studies 
 Ghina Badawi Lebanese professor and a leading director of Makassed  educational network 
 Taghrid Badawi a future creative manager 
Given name:
Badawi al-Jabal, a Syrian poet

Other:
Stage name of Israeli composer Raz Mesinai

See also
Al-Badawi
Bedouin

Arabic-language surnames
Bedouins